Jagat Guru Nanak Dev Punjab State Open University (JGND-PSOU) is a distance learning Public State University established through Punjab Act No. 19 of 2019, located in Patiala in the Indian state of Punjab.

History
As part of the state government's commemoration of the 550th Prakash Purb of Sri Guru Nanak Dev ji, the Punjab Cabinet on 24 October 2019 (Thursday) okayed the establishment of the public Jagat Guru Nanak Dev Punjab State Open University at Patiala, Punjab, India.

The university has started functioning from temporary campus at official residence of Principal, Government Mohindra College, Patiala.

Academics

Courses
 Bachelor of Arts (BA)
 Bachelor of Science (B.Sc.)
 Bachelor of Business Administration (BBA)

References

Universities in Punjab, India
Education in Patiala
Memorials to Guru Nanak
Educational institutions established in 2019
Distance education institutions based in India
Open universities in India
2019 establishments in Punjab, India